Micropholis cylindrocarpa is a species of plant in the family Sapotaceae. It is found in Brazil and Peru.

References

cylindrocarpa
Near threatened plants
Trees of Peru
Taxonomy articles created by Polbot